The Tarnished Angels is a 1957 black-and-white American CinemaScope drama film directed by Douglas Sirk and starring Rock Hudson, Robert Stack, Dorothy Malone, Jack Carson, and Robert Middleton. The screenplay by George Zuckerman is based on the 1935 novel Pylon by William Faulkner.

Plot
Disillusioned World War I flying ace Roger Shumann (Robert Stack) spends his days during the Great Depression making appearances as a barnstorming pilot at rural airshows with his parachutist wife LaVerne (Dorothy Malone), worshipful son Jack (Chris Olsen), and mechanic Jiggs (Jack Carson) in tow.

New Orleans reporter Burke Devlin (Rock Hudson) is intrigued by the gypsy-like lifestyle of the former war hero, but is dismayed by his cavalier treatment of his family and soon finds himself attracted to the neglected LaVerne. Meanwhile, Roger barters with aging business magnate Matt Ord (Robert Middleton) for a plane in exchange for a few hours with his wife. Tragedy ensues when Jiggs' anger about his employer's refusal to face family responsibilities causes him to make a rash and fatal decision. He manages, with some difficulty, to get Shumann's aircraft to start, but the plane crashes and Shumann is killed. After rejecting and then reconciling with Devlin, LaVerne returns to Iowa with Jack.

Cast

 Rock Hudson as Burke Devlin
 Robert Stack as Roger Shumann
 Dorothy Malone as LaVerne Shumann
 Jack Carson as Jiggs
 Robert Middleton as Matt Ord
 Alan Reed as Colonel Fineman
 Alexander Lockwood as Sam Hagood
 Chris Olsen as Jack Shumann
 Robert J. Wilke as Hank
 Troy Donahue as Frank Burnham
 William Schallert as Ted Baker
 Betty Utey as Dancing Girl 
 Phil Harvey as Telegraph Editor 
 Steve Drexel as Young Man
 Eugene Borden as Claude Mollet
 Stephen Ellis as Mechanic

Production
This Universal-International film reunited director Douglas Sirk with Robert Stack, Dorothy Malone, and Rock Hudson, with whom he had collaborated on Written on the Wind the previous year. In contrast to this film, in the earlier film Stack and Malone played brother and sister and Malone's character was infatuated with Hudson's character.

Sirk chose to shoot Angels in black-and-white to help capture the despondent mood of the era in which it is set. William Faulkner considered this film to be the best screen adaptation of his work.

Release and reception
The Tarnished Angels premiered in London in November 1957 and got its first American booking on Christmas Day 1957 in Charlotte, North Carolina, before going into general release.

In his review in The New York Times, Bosley Crowther said the film "was badly, cheaply written by George Zuckerman and is abominably played by a hand-picked cast. The sentiments are inflated — blown out of all proportions to the values involved. And the acting, under Douglas Sirk's direction, is elaborate and absurd." Variety called the film "a stumbling entry. Characters are mostly colorless, given static reading in drawn-out situations, and story line is lacking in punch."

More recent reviews, penned after a resurgence of interest and respect for Sirk's directing, are almost uniformly positive. In 1998, Jonathan Rosenbaum of the Chicago Reader included the film in his unranked list of the best American films not included on the AFI Top 100. Dave Kehr wrote in The New York Times: "The Tarnished Angels is among Sirk’s most self-conscious and artistically ambitious creations. ... This is bravura filmmaking in the service of a haunting vision. Yet there are moments of almost microscopic subtlety: the camera movement that expresses the moral reversal of the Hudson and Stack characters, one growing larger than the other; the infinite tenderness with which Hudson strokes Ms. Malone’s hair, helplessly trying to comfort her after a shock."

TV Guide rated the film four out of a possible four stars and called it "the best-ever adaptation of a Faulkner novel for the screen, directed with passion and perception by Sirk ... The acting is first-rate here, and the script is outstanding, full of wit, black humor, and occasional fine poetic monologues."

See also

 List of American films of 1957

References

External links 

American aviation films
Films about journalists
Films set in the 1930s
1957 drama films
1957 films
American black-and-white films
Films directed by Douglas Sirk
Universal Pictures films
Films based on American novels
Films based on works by William Faulkner
Films scored by Frank Skinner
CinemaScope films
1950s English-language films
1950s American films